The list of tallest buildings in Kansas City, Missouri focuses on the boom of higher residential occupancy downtown. The modernization of the skyline includes the Kansas City Power and Light Building, Municipal Auditorium, and the Kansas City Convention Center pylons.

Habitable

Other structures

Timeline

These buildings once held the title of tallest building in Kansas City, Missouri.

See also 
 List of tallest buildings in Missouri
 Architecture in Kansas City

References 

 American Institute of Architects/KC (2000). American Institute of Architects Guide to Kansas City Architecture & Public Art. pp. 21, 23, 25, 26, 29, 30, 32, 36, 47.
 Ehrlich, George (1992). Kansas City, Missouri; An Architectural History, 1826–1990. pp. 197, 201, 161, 187–195, 71, 94–96, 161.

External links
 Emporis.com
 Skyscraperpage.com

Kansas City, Missouri

Tallest in Kansas City